William McKechnie may refer to:
 William Sharp McKechnie, Scottish scholar and historian
 William Neil McKechnie, Royal Air Force officer
 Bill McKechnie, American baseball player, manager and coach
 Liam McKechnie (William Martin McKechnie), Irish judge